In probability theory, Eaton's inequality is a bound on the largest values of a linear combination of bounded random variables.  This inequality was described in 1974 by Morris L. Eaton.

Statement of the inequality

Let {Xi} be a set of real independent random variables, each with an expected value of zero and bounded above by 1 ( |Xi | ≤ 1, for 1 ≤ i ≤ n). The variates do not have to be identically or symmetrically distributed. Let {ai} be a set of n fixed real numbers with

 

Eaton showed that

 

where φ(x) is the probability density function of the standard normal distribution.

A related bound is Edelman's

 

where Φ(x) is cumulative distribution function of the standard normal distribution.

Pinelis has shown that Eaton's bound can be sharpened:

 

A set of critical values for Eaton's bound have been determined.

Related inequalities

Let {ai} be a set of independent Rademacher random variables – P( ai = 1 ) = P( ai = −1 ) = 1/2. Let Z be a normally distributed variate with a mean 0 and variance of 1. Let {bi} be a set of n fixed real numbers such that

 

This last condition is required by the Riesz–Fischer theorem which states that 

will converge if and only if 

 

is finite. 

Then 

 

for f(x) = | x |p. The case for p ≥ 3 was proved by Whittle and p ≥ 2 was proved by Haagerup.

If f(x) = eλx with λ ≥ 0 then 

where inf is the infimum.

Let 

Then

The constant in the last inequality is approximately 4.4634.

An alternative bound is also known:

This last bound is related to the Hoeffding's inequality.

In the uniform case where all the bi = n−1/2 the maximum value of Sn is n1/2. In this case van Zuijlen has shown that

 

where μ is the mean and σ is the standard deviation of the sum.

References

Probabilistic inequalities
Statistical inequalities